Helicophagus is a genus of shark catfishes native to Southeast Asia.

Species
There are currently three recognized species in this genus:
 Helicophagus leptorhynchus Ng & Kottelat, 2000
 Helicophagus typus Bleeker, 1857 
 Helicophagus waandersii Bleeker, 1858

H. leptorhynchus is known from the Chao Phraya and Mekong River drainages in Indochina. H. typus inhabits rivers of Sumatra and southeast Borneo. H. waandersii is known from medium- to large-sized rivers of Sumatra and Peninsular Malaysia.

H. leptorhynchus grows to about 47.2 centimetres (18.6 in) SL. H. typus reaches a length of about 37.7 cm (14.8 in) TL. H. waandersii has a maximum recorded length of about 70.0 cm (27.6 in) TL.

The stomachs of the specimens of H. waandersii are more or less filled with mollusks, usually bivalves. H. waandersii enters flooded forests. H. waandersii migrates upstream when water levels begin to rise at the beginning of the flood season and moves downstream as water clears at the end of the flood season.

Unlike H. waandersii, H. leptorhynchus stays in permanent river channels and does not move into flooded forests. However, it also migrates upstream and downstream with changes in the water level. H. leptorhynchus feeds primarily on bivalves.

References

Sitthi Kulabtong, Sawika Kunlapapuk and Piyathap Avakul. 2012. Some Fishery Biology of Molluscivorous Catfish,Helicophagus leptorhynchus in Thailand. Journal of Life Sciences 6(8):913-916.

Pangasiidae
Fish of Asia
Catfish genera
Taxa named by Pieter Bleeker
Freshwater fish genera